Sheghnan Airport  is located in the extreme northeast section of Afghanistan deep within Pamir mountain ranges in the Badakhshan Province of Afghanistan. The airport is close to the border with Tajikistan; to the east and parallel of the Shighnan airport is Khorog Airport in Tajikistan.

Facilities

See also
List of airports in Afghanistan

References

External links
 
 Airport record for Sheghnan Airport at Landings.com.

Airports in Afghanistan
Buildings and structures in Badakhshan Province